Scopula nesciaroides is a moth of the family Geometridae. It is found on Borneo, Sumatra and Siberut Island. The habitat consists of lowland areas.

The length of the forewings is about 11 mm. Adults are fawn or straw coloured.

References

Moths described in 1997
nesciaroides
Moths of Asia